Goodbye My Friend may refer to:

 "Goodbye My Friend", a song by Blind Guardian from Tales from the Twilight World
 "Goodbye My Friend", a song by Boney M. from Boonoonoonoos
 "Goodbye My Friend", a song by Dokken from Long Way Home
 "Goodbye My Friend", a song by Engelbert Humperdinck
 "Goodbye My Friend", a song by Karla Bonoff from New World
 "Goodbye My Friend", a song by Linda Ronstadt from Cry Like a Rainstorm, Howl Like the Wind
 "Goodbye My Friend", a song by Pop Evil from Onyx
 "Goodbye my friend, goodbye", a poem by Sergei Yesenin
 Goodbye, My Friend, an episode of 30 Rock
 Goodbye, My Friend, an episode of While You Were Sleeping
 Salam Ya Sahby (Goodbye My Friend), a 1986 Egyptian film

See also

 Farewell My Friend, a song by Dennis Wilson